Chachalaca (AMc-41) was an Accentor-class coastal minesweeper built by the Bristol Yacht Building Company, South Bristol, Maine and delivered to the U.S. Navy  at the Boston Navy Yard in August 1941.

Construction 

Chachalaca was down on 27 December 1940 by the Bristol Yacht Building Co., South Bristol, Maine, launched on 11 June 1941 and delivered to the Navy at the Boston Navy Yard 25 August 1941. The vessel was placed in service on 11 September 1941 with plans to report to Commandant, Fifth Naval District, for training at the Mine Warfare School at Yorktown, Virginia. Those plans were delayed by materiel conditions despite a request from the Chief of Naval Operations for accelerated readiness. After missing several departure dates the vessel departed Boston 5 January 1942 arriving at Hampton Roads 8 January.

Service 
The minesweeper was assigned to the Naval Operating Base at Trinidad on 1 April 1942 and began daily operations there. Those operations were interrupted with failures of the cable for the magnetic sweep. Local repairs were unsatisfactory with another break the day after repair. , the other minesweeper assigned to the area, also suffered failures. The Commander Inshore Patrol, Trinidad Sector, on 4 April 1942 requesting Bureau of Ships provide adequate spares noted the two vessels were "the only two vessels available between the British and ourselves that are capable of actually doing a sweeping job in the Gulf of Paria.”

The ship was assigned to the Caribbean Sea Frontier 23 July 1942 through 21 April 1944 when again reporting to Commandant, Tenth Naval District. Chachalaca continued minesweeping operations until the end of the war in the Atlantic and Europe. On 27 June 1945 the vessel was assigned to Commandant, Sixth Naval District based at Charleston, South Carolina. Chachalaca arrived there on 7 September 1945 where the vessel was placed out of service  4 January 1946 and stricken on 8 May. On 10 September 1947 the vessel was sold through the U.S. Maritime Commission to Evald Sooder of Miami, Florida.

References

External links 
 NavSource Online: Mine Warfare Vessel Photo Archive - Chachalaca (AMc 41)

 

Accentor-class minesweepers
World War II minesweepers of the United States
Ships built in South Bristol, Maine
1941 ships